Donald Emerson Irwin (July 22, 1913 – June 8, 1983) was an American football running back in the National Football League (NFL) for the Boston/Washington Redskins.  He played college football at Colgate University and was drafted in the seventh round of the 1936 NFL Draft.

References

External links
 

1913 births
1983 deaths
American football fullbacks
Colgate Raiders football players
Boston Redskins players
Washington Redskins players
Players of American football from New York City